High schools in Bangladesh are institutions where 11–16 year olds take their lessons. There are approximately 23,500+ high schools in Bangladesh.

History 

Rajshahi Collegiate School is the first and oldest school in the country and has a long tradition and reputation of spreading the light of education.
The six oldest high schools in Bangladesh, by year of establishment, are: Barisal Zilla School (1829), Dhaka Collegiate School (1835), Rangpur Zilla School (1832), Rajshahi Collegiate School (1828),Sylhet Government Pilot High School (1836) and Jashore Zilla School(1838) .

High school education system in Bangladesh 
The education system in Bangladesh is divided into four stages. The second level is High School which incorporates grade 6 to 10. There are both English Medium and Bangla Medium school in Bangladesh. Government prefer Bangla medium schools. Though there are some cadet colleges which are also government owned institutions and they offer English medium studies. Usually, the private schools are offer English medium.

Bangla medium 
Bangla Medium schools follow the national curriculum, examinations are Secondary School Certificate (SSC) and Higher Secondary School Certificate (HSC).

English Version 
English Version schools follow the national curriculum and have similar examinations, such as SSC and HSC, but the medium of teaching is English language.

English medium 
English medium schools in Bangladesh follow the Cambridge International Examinations (CIE) curriculum or the Edexcel curriculum. Examinations are O-Levels and A-Levels. They are governed by Private (English medium) School and College Ordinance 1962 and the Private English Medium School Registration Rules, 2007.

Number of high schools 
There are seven educational boards in Bangladesh. Every high school has a particular education board. The number of high schools for every educational board are given below.

See also 
 Education in Bangladesh

References